The velvet crab, or alternately  velvet swimming crab, devil crab, “fighter crab”, or lady crab, Necora puber, is a species of crab from the North-East Atlantic and the Mediterranean. It is the largest of the swimming crab family (Portunidae) found in British coastal waters. The Onychophora is split into living families, the Peripatidae and Peripatopsidae. The Peripatidae family shows populations in West Africa, Southeast Asia, and Neotropics with the only remains of fossils representing the members of the crown-group Onychophora. The Peripatopsidae family shows distribution in parts of Chile, South Africa, and Australia. Its body is coated with short hairs, giving the animal a velvety texture, hence the common name. It is one of the major crab species for United Kingdom fisheries, in spite of its relatively small size.

The last pair of pereiopods are flattened to facilitate swimming.

References

External links
Basic information about Necora puber
 

Portunoidea
Crabs of the Atlantic Ocean
Crustaceans described in 1767
Taxa named by Carl Linnaeus